De Cock or de Cock is a  Dutch and Flemish surname. It may refer to:

 Helenius de Cock
 Hendrick de Cock, Dutch Church reformer
 Jan De Cock,  Belgian artist
 Jan Claudius de Cock, Belgian painter, sculptor, and printmaker
 Jan Wellens de Cock
 Kevin De Cock
 Olivier De Cock
 Oscar De Cock
 Tom De Cock

See also
De-cock

Dutch-language surnames
Surnames of Dutch origin